Isaiah "Ike" Harris (born November 27, 1952 in West Memphis, Arkansas) is a former American football wide receiver in the NFL for the St. Louis Cardinals (1975–77) and the New Orleans Saints (1978–81).

Harris played college football at Iowa State University. In 1974, he played for the Southern California Sun of the World Football League.  He next joined the NFL, where he caught 211 passes in his career for 16 touchdowns.

Harris was President of BellSouth Enterprises and was named one of the 75 Most Powerful African-Americans in Corporate America by Black Enterprise Magazine.

Harris has been a member of the board of directors of CIGNA Corporation since 2005, and has been named to take over as non-executive chairman of the board on January 1, 2010.

References

1952 births
Living people
People from Memphis, Tennessee
American football wide receivers
Iowa State Cyclones football players
St. Louis Cardinals (football) players
New Orleans Saints players
Southern California Sun players
People from West Memphis, Arkansas
American telecommunications industry businesspeople